Yaw Shin Leong (born 2 June 1976) is a Singaporean businessman and former politician of the Worker's Party. He was expelled from the Worker's Party with immediate effect on 15 February 2012 after news of a rumoured extramarital affair broke out.  

He was previously a treasurer and was a Member of Parliament representing the constituency of Hougang after the 2011 Singapore General Elections.

Early life
Yaw's father died when he was 13. His widowed mother then scrimped and saved to bring up both his younger sister and himself, and supporting them through tertiary education.

Yaw served as a medic with the Singapore Armed Forces.

Education
Yaw had his secondary and pre-university education in Bukit Panjang Government High School and Jurong Junior College. He holds a Bachelor of Arts (BA, Merit) degree in Political Science & Sociology from National University of Singapore. He also holds a Master of Business Administration (MBA) from University of Western Sydney.

Political career
Yaw joined the Workers' Party in June 2001 and was elected into Central Executive Council (CEC) a year later. He remained in CEC until 7 February 2012 when he suddenly stepped down from the post of Treasurer.

In the 2006 Singapore General Election, Yaw was candidate and leader of The Workers' Party team that contested the Prime Minister's seat of Ang Mo Kio Group Representative Constituency.  Made up largely of young, first-time candidates under the age of 35, the team was dubbed the "suicide squad" by the media, and the People's Action Party chairman Lim Boon Heng boldly predicted that the Prime Minister's team would win 80 to 85% of the votes, putting the "suicide squad" at risk of losing their deposits. However, Yaw's team managed to secure more than one-third of the votes against the PAP team led by Prime Minister Lee Hsien Loong.

In December 2010, Yaw published a Chinese book 'Towards Political Vibrancy & Development' (迈向政治发展与繁荣) a translation of his selected English blog posts which include reflections on his 10-odd years of political participation.

Yaw became the Workers' Party candidate for Hougang Single Member Constituency during the 2011 Singapore General Election after the former MP, party leader Low Thia Khiang, opted to vacate his seat of 20 years to contest in Aljunied Group Representation Constituency with other Workers' Party candidates. Low gave Yaw his strong personal endorsement after explaining to the voters of Hougang that his decision to leave was one of the most difficult decisions in his life, saying that he needed to do so to break the PAP's monopoly on Parliament.

On 7 May 2011, Yaw won the Hougang Single Member Constituency with 64.8% of the vote beating Desmond Choo of the PAP, who took 35.1% of the vote. His margin of victory was the highest-ever achieved by the Workers' Party since it first won the constituency in 1991. Yaw, along with fellow MP, Dr Chia Shi-Lu and Mr Ong Teng Koon, was invited to join the Advisory Council on Community Relations in Defence (Accord) which he accepted.

Appointments Held in Workers' Party
Member, The Workers' Party. (Jun 2001 – Feb 2012)
Legislative Assistant (LA), Mr Low Thia Khiang's MP Office. (2001–2005)
Town Councillor, Hougang Town Council (HGTC). (2001–2005)
Secretary, Hougang Constituency Committee (HGCC). (2001–2005)
Secretary of GRC Area Committee. (2003–2005)
Secretary, Northern Area Committee (NAC), The Workers' Party. (2005–2006)
Co-Secretary, Eastern Area Committee (EAC), The Workers' Party. (2005–2006)
Deputy Organising Secretaries, Central Executive Council (CEC), The Workers' Party. (2002–2005)
Chairman, Youth Action Committee (YAC), The Workers' Party. (2001–2005)
Exco Member, The WP Youth Wing (WPYW). (2005–2006)
Webmaster, The Workers' Party. (2001–2004)
Organising Secretaries, Central Executive Council (CEC), The Workers' Party. (2006 – 6 June 2011)
Chairman, Central Area Committee (CAC), The Workers' Party. (2006–2011)
Treasurer, Central Executive Council (CEC), The Workers' Party. (7 June 2011 – 7 February 2012)
Chairman, Hougang Constituency Committee (HGCC). (2011–2012)
Vice-Chairman, Aljunied–Hougang Town Council (AHTC). (2011–2012)
Vice-Chairman, Hougang Constituency Education Trust (HCET). (2011–2012)

Expulsion from Party

In January 2012, news of a rumoured extramarital affair with a fellow member of the Workers' Party broke out. Yaw said he did not intend to respond to the rumours. In another report, a married PRC woman claimed to have had an affair with Yaw.

After Yaw's resignation of his treasurer post, netizens queried and speculated on the reason for his resignation.

On 15 February 2012, the Workers' Party announced that Yaw has been expelled with immediate effect, citing 'indiscretions in personal life' as reasons for expulsion. Prior to his expulsion, the Worker's Party's Central Executive Council invited Yaw to explain himself several times, but he failed to attend the meetings. Worker's Party admonished Yaw for "[breaking] the faith, trust and expectations of the Party and People".

On 22 February 2012, Yaw emailed the then Speaker of Parliament, Michael Palmer, that he will not be contesting his expulsion. As a result, his seat is deemed vacant as from the date of his expulsion on 14 February 2012.

Yaw has resided in Myanmar since late 2016 after he was expelled by the Workers' Party.

Career
Yaw founded and managed an enrichment programme development firm, Eduhearts Consultancy from from 2005 to 2012 and a Managing Partner of Easto Global LLP, was also an adjunct Lecturer in Business Studies, and also a former Business Management lecturer in Raffles College of Higher Education from 2008 to 2010.

After the fall of his political career, Yaw, under the name/alias, Amos Rao, picked himself up and has ventured to Myanmar to work as the senior vice-president of Shenton Co, a private education training institute, and also the general manager of three subsidiaries there, including Temasek International College, which awards degrees and diplomas in international business and hospitality.

Personal life
In 2004, Yaw married Ng Mei Sze, a dean and a head of department at a top school. Their marriage lasted for about a year and was annulled.

In 2006, Yaw got to know his present wife, Lau Wang Lin, and married her in November 2008.

References

Chinese businesspeople
Chinese Christians
Singaporean people of Teochew descent
Singaporean businesspeople
Singaporean Christians
1976 births
Living people
Workers' Party (Singapore) politicians
National University of Singapore alumni
Western Sydney University alumni